Stetson Pond is a  warm water pond in Pembroke, Massachusetts. The pond is characterized by brown water with a transparency of five feet. Access to the pond is provided by a dirt launch located off Plymouth Street, near Route 36. The launch is suitable for car top boats and canoes and is owned by the Town of Pembroke.

External links
MassWildlife - Pond Maps

Ponds of Plymouth County, Massachusetts
Pembroke, Massachusetts
Ponds of Massachusetts